KDBN (101.1 FM, "KSUN") is an American radio station licensed to serve the community of Parachute, Colorado. The station is currently owned by KSUN Community Radio Corporation.

KSUN community radio broadcasts programming selected from its members and community input. KSUN is volunteer run and listener supported.

KDBN formerly broadcast an active rock music format that was a simulcast of KKNN (95.1 FM) in Delta, Colorado.

References

External links

DBN
Radio stations established in 2008